Red squirrel may refer to:

 The red squirrel or Eurasian red squirrel (Sciurus vulgaris);
 The American red squirrel (Tamiasciurus hudsonicus);
 The northern Amazon red squirrel (Sciurus igniventris);
 The southern Amazon red squirrel (Sciurus spadiceus);
 The Red Squirrel, a Spanish film, first released in 1993;
 Red Squirrel Road, a logging road located within the Municipality of Temagami, in the Nipissing District, Ontario, Canada;
 Red Squirrel Lake, a lake located within the municipality of Temagami, Ontario, Canada;
 Red Squirrel River, an alternate name for the Anima Nipissing River, in the Nipissing District, Canada.

Animal common name disambiguation pages